John Samuel Potts (12 August 1861 – 28 April 1938) was a Labour Party politician in the United Kingdom who served a Member of Parliament (MP) for twelve years between 1922 and 1938.

Born in Bolton, Lancashire, Potts had started work at Durham Colliery at the age of eleven. He was a checkweighman at the Hemsworth Colliery, Yorkshire, for 25 years. At the Barnsley by-election of 1897, Potts supported the Liberal Party candidate Joseph Walton. While chairing a Liberal election meeting during this by-election, Potts said in the presence of Walton that he would favour a labour party at a time when state payment of MPs, and of official election expenses would enable working men to be maintained in Parliament but until then, "the Liberal Party was the working man’s only hope". In 1905, Potts switched sides, and began working with the Independent Labour Party against Walton, and the leadership of the Yorkshire Miners' Association (YMA). Ten years later, Potts was elected as treasurer of the YMA, and became a member of the executive committee of the Miners' Federation of Great Britain. He kept these positions until he was elected as the Member of Parliament for Barnsley at the 1922 general election, when payment of MPs and election expenses had been enacted. Potts retained the seat at three further elections in the 1920s. When Labour split at the 1931 general election over Ramsay MacDonald's formation of a National Government, he narrowly lost his seat to the National Liberal candidate Richard John Soper.

Potts was comfortably re-elected at the 1935 general election, but died in office in 1938, in Barnsley, aged 76. His illness and death have been connected with the shock he received when the Wharncliffe Woodmoor Pit Disaster occurred two years earlier. His lived on the lane which led to the colliery.

References

External links 
 

1861 births
1938 deaths
Labour Party (UK) MPs for English constituencies
Miners' Federation of Great Britain-sponsored MPs
UK MPs 1922–1923
UK MPs 1923–1924
UK MPs 1924–1929
UK MPs 1929–1931
UK MPs 1935–1945
Politics of Barnsley